Dugall Quin is Child ballad 294.

Synopsis

Dugall Quin woos Lisie Meanes, asking her how she likes him in his ragged dress; she answers that she likes him and asks how he likes her in her fine clothing; he likes her and asks her to come with him.  Her father asks her not to go.  She defies him.  Dugall tells her that if he comes with him, he will make her a lady.  She goes, and he marries her.

See also
List of the Child Ballads
Lizie Lindsay
The Beggar-Laddie
Glasgow Peggie
Bonny Lizie Baillie

External links
Dugall Quin

Child Ballads
Songwriter unknown
Year of song unknown